The Deadhorse Creek diatreme complex is a diatreme complex in northwestern Ontario, Canada, located approximately  west of Marathon.

See also
Volcanism of Canada
Volcanism of Eastern Canada
List of volcanoes in Canada

References

Diatremes of Ontario
Landforms of Thunder Bay District
Proterozoic volcanoes